Ana Rita Camarneiro Mendes (born 15 January 1988) is a Portuguese comedian and TV presenter.

Career
She started her career in television at Rádio e Televisão de Portugal, the public service broadcasting organisation of Portugal. There, she did stand-up comedy and worked as a scriptwriter for late-night talk show 5 Para A Meia-Noite. She also wrote the television film  in 2012.

She played a role in Mau Mau Maria, a 2014 comedy film.

In late 2014, Camarneiro joined private broadcaster SIC Radical, where she became the new presenter of the CC All-Stars show.

In addition to her activities in television, Camarneiro has also worked for radio stations on several occasions. She currently co-hosts Antena 3's Prova oral up to five times per week.

Personal life
Camarneiro is a native of Figueira da Foz, Coimbra District, in central Portugal. She has two older brothers, one of which is the novelist Nuno Camarneiro.

Before committing on her current career, she successfully completed a master's degree course in psychology at the University of Coimbra.

References

External links

1988 births
Living people
People from Figueira da Foz
Portuguese women comedians
Portuguese radio presenters
Portuguese women radio presenters
Portuguese television actresses
Portuguese television directors
Portuguese women television presenters
Portuguese women psychologists
Women television directors